Tunel i Parë (in Albanian) or Prvi Tunel (in Serbian: Први Тунел) is a settlement in the municipality of Mitrovica in the District of Mitrovica, Kosovo. According to the 2011 census, it has 1,006 inhabitants.

Demography 

In 2011 census, the village had in total 1,006 inhabitants, from whom 998 (99,20 %) were Albanians, seven Bosniaks (0,70 %) and one other.

Notes

References 

Villages in Mitrovica, Kosovo